Live 2000 may refer to:

 Live 2000 Michael Landau (2007) 
Live 2000 by Celtus
Live (Elkie Brooks album)
NBA Live 2000